Imperial Iranian Army's Second Bureau (Rokn-e-Dovvom) was an Iranian military intelligence agency during the Pahlavi dynasty from 1926 to 1979.

Establishment and structure 
Second Bureau was one of the four main bureaus operating in the army alongside First Bureau, responsible for Human resources, Third Bureau, responsible for operations and Fourth Bureau responsible for logistics. It was active since reign of Reza Shah and received information from military attachés in target countries.
Modeled after the Deuxième Bureau, the French elite officers who were teaching at War University and Officers' School before World War II were founders of Iran's military intelligence service. The service was later contributed by British secret services.

On 7 September 1955, the "Intelligence Bureau of Imperial Iranian Army Headquarters" was established.

During reign of Mohammad Reza Shah, the agency directly reported to him.

Role 
Alongside acting as the military intelligence apparatus of the army and conducting counterintelligence operations, it was responsible for internal security and surveillance work involving military personnel, as well as civilians. 
The unit's operations was parallel to those of Shahrbani and Ministry of Interior. Until 1953 Iranian coup d'état, it was considered Iran's sole intelligence agency.

After Organization of Intelligence and National Security (SAVAK) was established, it had close ties to the military. Although some of army intelligence officers were transferred to SAVAK and some simultaneously served in both agencies; an interservice rivalry emerged between the two and even became an open secret to people.

See also 

 Intelligence Protection Organization of Islamic Republic of Iran Army

References 

Imperial Iranian Armed Forces
Defunct Iranian intelligence agencies
Iranian security organisations
Military intelligence agencies